Weaverham is a village and civil parish in the Borough of Cheshire West and Chester and the ceremonial county of Cheshire in England. Just off the A49, it is just to the west of Northwich and south of the River Weaver, and has a population of 6,589, decreasing to 6,391 at the 2011 UK Census.

Weaverham is also home to the Anglican Church of St Mary, the Roman Catholic church of St Bede and the Methodist church of All Saints.  From September 2011, the Storehouse Church also meets weekly in Weaverham.

The schools in Weaverham include the following: three primary schools: St. Bede's Roman Catholic Primary School, Weaverham Forest School and University Primary Academy Weaverham, formerly Wallerscote Community Primary School. There is also a special needs school, The Russett School.

Weaverham is adjacent to Owley Wood, part of the Mersey Forest. The wood extends for over  along the River Weaver valley and is named after the tawny owls which inhabit the area.

Governance
An electoral ward in the name of Weaver and Cuddington exists. This covers both parishes and the surrounding area. The total population of the ward at the 2011 UK Census was 12,779.

Notable people 
 Audrey Beecham (1915 in Weaverham – 1989) an English poet, teacher and historian. 
 Albert Johnson (1920 in Weaverham – 2011) a professional footballer who played as an outside right for Everton, Chesterfield and Witton Albion
 Peter Gammond (born 1925) a British music critic, writer, journalist, musician, poet, and artist. He lived in Weaverham from 1930 to 1950

See also

Listed buildings in Weaverham
St Mary's Church, Weaverham

References

External links

Wallerscote Pre-School Website
Wallerscote School Website
The Storehouse Church Website
Weaverham Village Show Website

Villages in Cheshire
Civil parishes in Cheshire